This is a list of episodes for the television series Hello, Larry. The series aired for two seasons, from January 1979 to April 1980, with a total of 38 episodes. It featured three crossover episodes in which the cast of Diff'rent Strokes appeared.

Series overview
Sources:

Episodes

Season 1 (1979)

Season 2 (1979–80)

See also
 List of Diff'rent Strokes episodes

References

External links
 
 

Hello, Larry